Marilyn Horne & Frederica von Stade: Lieder & Duets is a 49-minute classical studio album in which Horne sings songs by Robert Schumann and Antonin Dvoŕák, and Horne and von Stade sing duets by Felix Mendelssohn Bartholdy, all accompanied by Martin Katz on the piano. The recording was released in 1993.

Recording
The album was digitally recorded on 8, 10 and 17 July 1992 in the Lehmann Hall of the Music Academy of the West in Santa Barbara, California.

Packaging
The cover of the album was designed under the art direction of J. J. Stelmach, and features a photograph of Horne, von Stade and Katz taken by Christian Steiner.

Critical reception

J. B. Steane reviewed the album in Gramophone in March 1994. At first glance, he wrote, with von Stade and Horne equally prominent on its cover, it looked like an anthology of duets. In fact, most of it was sung by Horne alone, and, despite the sensitive support of Martin Katz at the piano, not entirely successfully. Yes, her singing was compelling and sometimes rewarding. Yes, in her Dvořák group, her "Gypsy Melodies [had] some panache". Yes, she was scrupulously restrained in her Schumann group. Yes, she was "careful over her German", enunciating clearly. And yes, she was spine-tingling in the last of the Frauenliebe songs, portraying "a woman in whom the change wrought by catastrophe [was] total and shocking". But her Schumann was a little monotonous, and her performance of both sets of Lieder suffered from the vocal deterioration entailed by her advancing years. Her voice was uneven, no longer as firm or as fresh as it needed to be, and afflicted by "a wide and persistent vibrato". When she sang her Mendelssohn duets with von Stade, on the other hand, the results were happier: her vibrato was less obtrusive, and her voice blended well with that of her younger friend. And that the two mezzos' "nuance and phrasing [were] unanimous and well judged" was evidence of conscientious preparation. Brigitte Fassbaender, Steane observed, had developed vocal difficulties comparable to Horne's. and yet remained a magnetic performer because her gifts as an artist were so extraordinary. But Horne's communicative powers were not great enough to compensate for her voice's decline. She could no longer be relied upon to give pleasure when singing Lieder on disc.

A second review of the album can be found in Fanfares subscriber-only archive.

CD track listingRobert Schumann (1810–1856)Frauenliebe und -leben, Op. 42 (texts by Adalbert von Chamisso)
 1 (2:29) Seit ich ihn gesehen
 2 (3:10) Er, der Herrlichste von allen
 3 (1:44) Ich kann's nicht fassen, nicht glauben
 4 (2:40) Du Ring an meinem Finger
 5 (2:04) Helft mir, ihr Schwestern
 6 (4:51) Süsser Freund, du blickest
 7 (1:08) An meinem Herzen, an meiner Brust
 8 (4:25) Nun hast du mir den ersten Schmerz getanFelix Mendelssohn Bartholdy (1809–1847)

 9 (2:02) Ich wollt' meine Lieb', Op. 63 No. 1 (text by Heinrich Heine)
10 (2:34) Gruss, Op. 63 No. 3 (text by Joseph von Eichendorff)
11 (2:28) Volkslied: O wert thou in the cauld blast, Op. 63 No. 5 (text by Robert Burns)
12 (2:30) Abendlied (text by Heinrich Heine)Antonín Dvořák (1841–1904)Zigeunermelodien''''', Op. 55, B. 104 (texts by Adolf Heyduk)
13 (3:02) Mein Lied ertönt 
14 (1:15) Ei, wie mein Triangel
15 (3:30) Rings ist der Wald
16 (1:16) Reingestimmt die Saiten
17 (1:37) In dem weiten, breiten, lüft'gen Leinenkleide
18 (2:40) Als die alte Mutter
19 (2:04) Darf des Falken Schwinge

Personnel

Musical
 Marilyn Horne, mezzo-soprano (tracks 1–19)
 Frederica von Stade, mezzo-soprano (tracks 9–12)
 Martin Katz, piano (tracks 1–19)

Other
 John Pfeiffer, producer
 J. Magee, balance engineer
 F. Vogler, engineer
 P. Hopf, engineer

Release history
In 1993, RCA Victor Red Seal released the album on CD (catalogue number 09026 61681 2) with a 40-page insert booklet including texts, biographies of the artists and programme notes by Robert L. Lustig in English, French and German.

References

Frederica von Stade albums
1993 classical albums